The Obediah Shirley House, sometimes referred to as the Obediah and Jennie Shirley Home is a historic farmhouse with a fieldstone foundation, located near Honea Path, South Carolina. Its construction was completed in several phases in order to accommodate the Shirley family as their family grew in number. The original, one-story log cabin was built in 1826 with the second-floor and two rooms to the north added before 1850. After 1850, a third room was added to the house, which increased the width. The front porch and kitchen were added in later in the 19th century.

The house was owned by descendants of Obediah Shirley until 1988, when the house and one acre of land was donated to the Obediah Shirley House Foundation. Structural restoration was completed after the donation, including leveling the foundation with boulders from an adjacent property, replacement of the porch roof framing, and a new roof. The house is currently open to tour by appointment.

References

Houses on the National Register of Historic Places in South Carolina
Houses completed in 1826
Houses in Anderson County, South Carolina
National Register of Historic Places in Anderson County, South Carolina
1826 establishments in South Carolina